Rai Fiction is an Italian production company founded in 1997. It is owned and operated by Radiotelevisione Italiana (RAI), the national broadcasting company of Italy.

The company produces content for RAI's channels. The company produces animation, sitcoms, and other programmes. The company also works in association with foreign production studios and TV channels as well as other production companies in Italy.

Productions

TV series
La piovra (1984)
 Un posto al sole (1996–present)
 Un medico in famiglia (1998–2016)
Inspector Montalbano (1999–2021)
Don Matteo (2000-2020)
 Dracula (2002)
 Perlasca, un Eroe Italiano (2002)
Un caso di coscienza (2003–2013)
 Milo (2003)–with Paz
Provaci ancora prof (2005-2017)
 L'ispettore Coliandro (2006–2010)
 Capri (2006–2010)
 La buona battaglia – Don Pietro Pappagallo (2006)
Tutti pazzi per amore (2008–2012)
 Usahana (2008–present)
Pinocchio (2009)
 C'era una volta la città dei matti... (2010)
Che Dio ci aiuti (2011–present)
Cugino & cugino (2011)
Fuoriclasse (2011–2015)
Caccia al Re – La narcotici (2011)
Rossella (2011–2013)
Un passo dal cielo (2011–present)
The Young Montalbano (2012–2015)
Una grande famiglia (2012–2015)
Carlo & Malik (2012)
Braccialetti rossi (2014–2016)
È arrivata la felicità (2015–2018)
Il paradiso delle signore (2015–present)
La dama velata (2015)
Thou Shalt Not Kill (2015–2018)
The Mafia Kills Only in Summer (2016)
Non dirlo al mio capo (2017)
Suburra: Blood on Rome (2017–2020)
La porta rossa (2017–2023)
 Medici (2016–2019)
 My Brilliant Friend (2019–present) - Co-production with HBO and TIMvision (season 1)
 The Name of the Rose (2019) - Co-production with Tele München Gruppe
 Leonardo (2021)

TV Films
Imperium
Imperium: Augustus (2003)
Imperium: Nero (2004)
Imperium: Saint Peter (2005)
Imperium: Pompeii (2007)
Augustine: The Decline of the Roman Empire (2010)
Bartali: The Iron Man (2006)
Il Pirata: Marco Pantani (2007)
Barabbas (2012)
Il bambino cattivo (2013)

Animated series
Lupo Alberto (1997-2002)
Princess Sissi (1997)
 Tommy and Oscar (1999)
Cocco Bill (2001-2004)
Gino the Chicken (2002)
Pet Pals (2003)
The Adventures of Marco & Gina (2003)
 Martin Mystery (2003–2006)
 The Spaghetti Family (2003)
 Clic & Kat (2004) – a short animated television series. It was co–produced by MatitAnimatA, Cineteam and Rai Fiction in 2004. The series is broadcast on Rai 2, ZDF, and from March 4, 2014, the Italian channel Planet Kids.
Wheel Squad (2000-2002)
 Winx Club (2004–2015; now co–produced by Rai Ragazzi)
 Monster Allergy (2005–2009)
 Team Galaxy (2006–2007)
School for Vampires (2006-2010)
 Ripples (2007–2009)
Water & Bubbles (2007-2010)
Arturo & Kiwi (2007-2010)
 Il mondo di Stefi (2008)
  Matt's Monsters (2008)
 Gawayn (2008–2012)
 Stellina (2008–2009)
PsicoVip (2009)
 Rahan (2009–2010)
 Geronimo Stilton (2009–2017)
 Huntik: Secrets & Seekers (2009–2012)
 Spike Team (2010–present)
 Henry the Cat (2010–2013)
 Teen Days (2010)
 The Invisible Man (2011)
Lucky Fred (2011)
 The DaVincibles (2011)
FloopaLoo, Where Are You? (2011-2014)
Mofy (2013)
 Regal Academy (2016–2018)
 Pat the Dog (2017–present)
Trulli Tales (2017–present)
 Leonardo (2018–present)

Animated Movies
 Monster Mash (2000, co-production with DIC Entertainment)

Partnerships
 Viacom (Nickelodeon, Rainbow S.p.A.)
 ZDF
 Futurikon
 Animabit
 Disney Télévision France
 MoonScoop Group
 SMEC
 Screen 21
 M6
 Eurocartoons
 Warner Bros. International Television
 Home Box Office, Inc.
and many more.

History Logo

References

External links
 Official Site

Fiction
Mass media companies established in 1997
Film production companies of Italy
Mass media companies of Italy